Jean-Joseph Benjamin-Constant (also known as Benjamin-Constant), born Jean-Joseph Constant (10 June 1845 – 26 May 1902), was a French painter and etcher best known for his Oriental subjects and portraits.

Biography

Benjamin-Constant was born in Paris. He studied at the Ecole des Beaux-Arts in Toulouse, where he was a pupil of Alexandre Cabanel. A journey to Morocco in 1872 strongly influenced his early artistic development and lead him to produce Romantic scenes under the spell of Orientalism. Among his noted works in this vein are  Last Rebels, Justice in the Harem (both in the Luxembourg Gallery), Les Chérifas, and Moroccan Prisoners (Bordeaux).  His large canvas, The Entrance of Mahomet II into Constantinople (Musée des Augustins Toulouse), received a medal in 1876.

After 1880, he changed his manner, devoting himself to mural decorations and to portraits.  Prominent examples include the great plafond in the Hôtel de Ville, Paris, entitled Paris Convening the World; his paintings in the New Sorbonne, representing Literature, The Sciences, and the Academy of Paris; and the plafond of the Opéra Comique theatre.  He was distinguished as a portrait painter, especially in England, where he was a favorite of the aristocracy.  His portrait Mons fils André (Luxembourg) was awarded a medal of honor at the Salon in 1896.

Benjamin-Constant painted Pope Leo XIII, Queen Alexandra of the United Kingdom (1901), Lord John Lumley-Savile, and Henri Blowitz (1902).  He was made a member of the institute in 1893, and was a commander of the Legion of Honor.  He visited the United States several times, and painted a number of portraits.  The Metropolitan Museum of Art in New York exhibited a large painting by Benjamin-Constant entitled Justinian in Council. The painting was returned by the Metropolitan to the owners family in 1928. It was purchased by John Ringling in 1929 and is currently on exhibit in the Ringling Museum in Sarasota

Benjamin-Constant also taught at Académie Julian; among his pupils was the miniaturist Alice Beckington and the Scottish artist W. S. Shanks. He was a writer of repute, contributing a number of studies on contemporary French painters.  Along with fellow artists, Nasreddine Dinet, Paul Leroy, Jean-Léon Gérôme and curator/ art historian, Léonce Bénédite, he was one of the founders of the Société des Peintres Orientalistes Français.

He died in Paris on 26 May 1902.

Gallery

See also
Le jour des funérailles - Scène du Maroc
 List of Orientalist artists
 Orientalism
 Société des Peintres Orientalistes Français

Publications

References

External links

1845 births
1902 deaths
19th-century French painters
20th-century French painters
19th-century French male artists
20th-century French male artists
Academic art
Commandeurs of the Légion d'honneur
French male non-fiction writers
French male painters
French biographers
Academic staff of the Académie Julian
Members of the Académie des beaux-arts
Orientalist painters